Steamer South American was a Great Lakes steamer built by the Great Lakes Engineering Works at Ecorse, Michigan. It was built in 1913/14 for the Chicago, Duluth & Georgian Bay Transit Company. The vessel was launched on February 21, 1914 and was the newer of two near-sister ships, the older one being the North American.

She was equipped with a 2,200 indicated horsepower quadruple-expansion steam engine and three coal-burning Scotch marine boilers.

She caught fire on September 9, 1924 in winter lay-up at Holland, Michigan.  Her upper works were rebuilt that winter.  Also at the time, a second smokestack was added and her coal-fired boilers were converted to oil-burning.

In 1967, the South American departed from her usual schedule to offer trips to the 1967 World's Fair in Montreal. At the end of the season, she was retired from regular passenger service and sold to Seafarers International Union in Piney Point, Maryland, as a replacement for the North American which sank a year prior while in tow there.  Failing Coast Guard inspection, she was moved to Camden, New Jersey, where she rotted before being scrapped in 1992 in Baltimore.

References

External links
 Marine Historical Society of Detroit: SS South American
 New Great Lakes Steamship South American (International Marine Engineering; April 1914, pp. 135–140, article on new ship with profiles, plans and text)

Great Lakes ships
Steamships of the United States
1914 ships
Passenger ships of the United States
Ships built in Ecorse, Michigan
Passenger ships of the Great Lakes